Jermaine Smith (born February 3, 1972) is a former American Arena Football League player. He went to Laney High School in Augusta, Georgia, US, where he played defensive tackle as well as fullback. He began his collegiate career at Georgia Military College.  After two years, he transferred to the University of Georgia.

AFL career
Smith has played more regular season games with the Georgia Force (77) than any other player. Jermaine entered the 2008 season ranked 13th all-time in the Arena Football League in sacks.

Smith was picked up by the Tampa Bay Storm prior to the 2010 season of the current incarnation of the AFL.

References

External links
NFL.com profile
arenafan.com profile

1972 births
Living people
University of Georgia alumni
Georgia Bulldogs football players
Georgia Force players
Green Bay Packers players
Orlando Predators players
Las Vegas Outlaws (XFL) players
New York/New Jersey Hitmen players
Tampa Bay Storm players
Players of American football from Augusta, Georgia
San Jose SaberCats players